Verdana may refer to:

 Verdana, a sans-serif typeface designed by Matthew Carter for Microsoft Corporation
 Placename for a village of the town Bacoor, in the province of Cavite, Philippines
 Verdana Homes Mamplasan, an Asian-Balinese-themed community development in Mamplasan, Philippines
 Verdana (tennis shoe), a women's tennis shoe marketed by the athletic shoe and sports apparel manufacturer Nike, Inc.